Helen of Sweden ( 1190 – 1247, Swedish: Helena) was a Swedish princess and  daughter of King Sverker II of Sweden. She was the mother of Queen Catherine of Sweden. She was later  Abbess of Vreta Abbey.

Biography
Helen was born in Denmark, the daughter of King Sverker II and Queen Benedicta. Her father was an exile there at that time. In 1195 or 1196, he was crowned King of Sweden. In 1208, he was deposed, and in 1210, he died in battle.

Helen Sverkersdotter, the only daughter of the deposed king, was educated at Vreta Abbey at the time of her father's death.
Around 1210, Helen was one of the victims of the Vreta abductions.

Sune Folkesson was from one of the two dynasties that had been rivals for the Swedish throne since 1130, while Helen was from the other, the Sverker dynasty. Her relatives disapproved of the proposal of  Sune Folkason, the son of an earl who had been among Sverker's opponents in the battle in which he fell. According to folklore, Sune Folkason abducted Helena and took her to the Ymseborg Castle.   They married and two daughters survived from their marriage;  Benedicta of Bjelbo and Catherine Sunesdotter.

In 1216, Helen's brother became King John I of Sweden. When he died childless in 1222, Helen and her daughters became heirs of the Sverker dynasty. In 1243, her daughter, Catherine Sunesdotter  (c. 1215 – 1252), was married to King Eric XI, thus finally uniting the two Swedish dynasties. 

Around 1244, Benedikte Sunadotter, the younger daughter of Sune Folkason and Helena Sverkersdotter,  was abducted by Laurens Pedersson, Justiciar of Östergötland while she was being educated at the Vreta convent. Benedikte was soon released and married high noble Svantepolk Knutsson, Lord of Viby.

References

Other sources
 
 Borænius, Magnus i Klostret i Vreta i Östergötland 1724 & 2003 s. 31

Related reading
Lars O. Lagerqvist (1982)  Sverige och dess regenter under 1.000 år (Stockholm:  Bonniers Förlag AB) 

Helen 1190
1190s births
1247 deaths
Swedish Roman Catholic abbesses
13th-century Swedish nuns
Daughters of kings